Khachekin (also Romanized as Khāchekīn; also known as Hājkīn, Khadzhakhkin, Khājīkīn, Khājkīn, Khavaj Kin, Khvāchekīn, Khvājeh Kheyr, Khvājgīn, and Khvājkīn) is a village in Chukam Rural District, Khomam District, Rasht County, Gilan Province, Iran. At the 2006 census, its population was 1,824, in 524 families.

References 

Populated places in Rasht County